Lorenzo Johnston Greene (1899–1988) was an American educator who taught history at Lincoln University in Jefferson City, Missouri from 1933 to 1972. His book, Missouri’s Black Heritage, co-authored by Antonio Holland and Gary Kremer, was a pioneering work on the African-American experience in Missouri. He co-authored several works and his historical diaries and notes have been used in other historical texts, such as Selling Black History for Carter G. Woodson. He worked with Carter Woodson, who was known as the "Father of Black History".

Excerpts of his diary appeared in Black Dixie, a book about African-Americans in Houston.

Timeline

 1899, Nov.16  Born, Ansonia, Connecticut
 1924          B.A., Howard University, Washington, D.C.
 1926          M.A. in history, Columbia University, New York, N.Y.
 1928 – 1933   Field representative and research assistant to Carter G. Woodson, director, Association for the Study of Negro Life and History, Washington, D.C.
 1930          Published with Carter G. Woodson The Negro Wage Earner Washington, D.C.: Associated Publishers. 388 pp.)
 1931          Published with Myra C. Callis The Employment of Negroes in the District of Columbia (Washington, D.C.: Associated Publishers. 89 pp.)
 1933 – 1972   Instructor and professor of history, Lincoln University, Jefferson City, Mo.
 1942          PhD in history, Columbia University, New York, N.Y. Published The Negro in Colonial New England, 1620–1776 (New York: Columbia University Press. 404 pp.) Married Thomasina Talley
 1955          Chairman, program committee, Association for the Study of Negro Life and History annual meeting, Los Angeles, Calif.
 1947 – 1956   Editor, Midwest Journal, Lincoln University, Jefferson City, Mo.
 1964          Chairman, program committee, Association for the Study of Negro Life and History annual meeting, Detroit, Mich.
 1959 – 1961   Chairman, SubCommittee on Education, Missouri Advisory Committee to the United States Commission on Civil Rights
 1965 – 1966   President, Association for the Study of Negro Life and History
 1971          Honorary LH.D., University of Missouri, Columbia, Mo.
 1971 – 1972   Director, Institute for Drop-Out Prevention and Teacher Orientation, Jefferson City, Mo.
  1972 – 1974  Director, Institute to Facilitate Desegregation in Kansas City Public Schools, Kansas City, Mo.
 1980          Published with Antonio F. Holland and Gary Kremer Missouri's Black Heritage (St. Louis: Forum Press. 195 pp.)
 1988, Jan. 24 Died, Jefferson City, Missouri
 1988         Posthumous publication of Working with Carter G. Woodson, the Father of Black History, a Diary, 1928–30 (Baton Rouge: Louisiana State University Press. 487 pp.)

See also
African American history

External links

 Missouri's African American History
Carter Woodson, Father of Black History
 Oh Freedom, After Awhile. A sharecropper's history. Dr. Greene influenced university students to help the sharecroppers of 1939.
 African-American History and Culture
 Lorenzo Johnston Greene: A Registry of His Papers

1899 births
1988 deaths
American diarists
20th-century American historians
American male non-fiction writers
People from Ansonia, Connecticut
20th-century American male writers
Lincoln University (Missouri) faculty
Howard University alumni
Columbia University alumni
Historians from Missouri
African-American historians
20th-century diarists
20th-century African-American writers